Andrew Mann Inn is a historic inn located at Unadilla in Otsego County, New York. It was built as the private home of David Baits in 1787 and quickly converted into an inn in 1795.  It consists of a two-story, five-bay, rectangular main section and a two-story wing.  Both sections are of heavy timber-frame construction with clapboard siding.  It is a well-preserved example of the transitional period between the late Georgian and Federal styles.

It was listed on the National Register of Historic Places in 1980.

References

Houses completed in 1795
Houses on the National Register of Historic Places in New York (state)
Georgian architecture in New York (state)
Federal architecture in New York (state)
Houses in Otsego County, New York
National Register of Historic Places in Otsego County, New York